Sony ESPN was an Indian pay television sports channel which was a joint venture between ESPN Inc. and Sony Pictures Networks India. The channel targeted the Indian subcontinent including India, Nepal, Bangladesh and Sri Lanka. It was part of the Sony Pictures Sports Network group.

History
The channel launched on 8 April 2015 as Sony Kix, coinciding with the 2015 Indian Premier League.

In October 2015, Multi Screen Media announced a partnership with ESPN International, which would include the rebranding of Sony Kix as Sony ESPN, and collaboration on digital properties (including partnerships with properties such as ESPNcricinfo). The venture returned the ESPN brand to Indian television for the first time since Star India rebranded its ESPN Star Sports channels as Star Sports in 2013. The relaunch occurred on 17 January 2016 in standard and high-definition, coinciding with the 2016 Australian Open.

On 18 July 2017, the channel became part of Sony Pictures Sports Network following SPN's acquisition of TEN Sports.

The channel was shut down on 30 March 2020.

References

External links

ESPN
Sony Pictures Networks India
Television channels and stations established in 2015
Television stations in Mumbai
2015 establishments in Maharashtra
Television channels and stations disestablished in 2020
Defunct television channels in India